American Justice (also known as Jackals) is a 1986 American action crime drama film directed by Gary Grillo and starring Jameson Parker, Gerald McRaney and Wilford Brimley.

Cast
 Jameson Parker as Dave Buchanon
 Jack Lucarelli	as Joe Case
 Gerald McRaney as Jake Wheeler
 Wilford Brimley as Sheriff Mitchell
 Jeannie Wilson	as Jess Buchanon
 Rosanna DeSoto as Manuela

Reception
Leonard Maltin awarded the film two stars, calling it a "(p)redictable, forgettable action drama".

References

External links
 
 

1986 films
1980s action drama films
1980s crime action films
American crime action films
American crime drama films
American action drama films
Films scored by Paul Chihara
1986 drama films
1980s English-language films
1980s American films